Ardèche is a department in Auvergne-Rhône-Alpes, Southeastern France. It is named after the river Ardèche and had a population of 328,278 as of 2019. Its prefecture is in Privas, but its largest city is Annonay.

History

Prehistory and ancient history

The area has been inhabited by humans at least since the Upper Paleolithic, as attested by the famous cave paintings at Chauvet Pont d'Arc. The plateau of the Ardèche river has extensive standing stones (mainly dolmens but fewer menhirs), erected thousands of years ago. The river has one of the largest canyons in Europe and the caves that dot the cliffs—which go as high as 300 metres (1,000 feet)—are known for signs of prehistoric inhabitants (arrowheads and flint knives are often found).

The Vivarais, as the Ardèche is still called, takes its name and coat-of-arms from Viviers, which was the capital of the Gaulish tribe of Helvii, part of Gallia Narbonensis, after the destruction of their previous capital at Alba-la-Romaine. Saint Andéol, a disciple of Polycarp, is supposed to have evangelized the Vivarais during the reign of Emperor Septimius Severus, and was supposedly martyred in 208.  Legend tells of Andéol's burial by Amycia Eucheria Tullia. In 430, Auxonius transferred the see to Viviers as a result of the problems suffered at its previous site in Alba Augusta.

Medieval history
The area of the Vivarais suffered greatly in the 9th century with raids from Hungarians and Saracen slavers operating from the coast of Provence resulting in an overall depopulation of the region.

In the early 10th century, economic recovery saw the building of many Romanesque churches in the region including Ailhon, Mercuer, Saint Julien du Serre, Balazuc, Niègles and Rochecolombe. The medieval county of Viviers or Vivarais at this time was administratively a part of the Kingdom of Burgundy-Arles, formed in 933 with the fusion by Rudolph II of Burgundy of the realms of Provence and Burgundy and bequeathed by its last monarch Rudolph III of Burgundy to the Holy Roman Emperor Conrad II in 1032. Locally throughout this period, the Church played an important role. John II (Giovanni of Siena), Cardinal and Bishop of Viviers (1073–1095), accompanied Pope Urban II to the Council of Clermont.

It was later held in fief by the Counts of Toulouse, who lost it to the French crown in 1229. In 1284, with the Cistercian Abbey of Marzan, Philip IV established Villeneuve de Berg, and by the treaty of 10 July 1305 Philip IV of France obliged the bishops of Vivarais to admit the sovereignty of the Kings of France over all their temporal domain. The realm was largely ignored by the Emperors and was finally granted to France as part of the domain of the Dauphin, the future Charles VII of Valois in 1308. During this period, the Maillard family, as Counts of Tournon, were influential in the Ardèche. During the Hundred Years War, the area maintained its loyalty to the French crown, despite frequent attacks from the west.

Early modern history
As a result of the reformation of John Calvin in Geneva, the Vivarais Ardèche was one of the areas which strongly embraced Protestantism partly as a result of the missionary activity of 1534 by Jacques Valery. During the following Wars of Religion (1562–1598), the Ardèche was considered a strategically important location between Protestant Geneva, Lyon and Catholic Languedoc. The region had prospered with the introduction of tobacco growing from America, and the agrarian experiments of Olivier de Serres, father of modern French agriculture. The influence of Protestant Lyon, and the growth of the silk industry, thanks to the planting of mulberry trees, had given the burghers of the Vivarais towns a certain independence of thinking, and with the support of powerful Protestant Huguenots, (the Comte de Crussol and Olivier de Serres), the Vivarais became a Protestant stronghold. As a result, it suffered many attacks and eight pitched battles between 1562 and 1595. In 1598, the Edict of Nantes put an end to these struggles. At that time, the Vivarais had over 75 Protestant churches and five fortified strongholds with permanent garrisons. However, the problems of the area were not over. In 1629, Paule de Chambaud, daughter of the Huguenot lord of Privas, chose instead to marry a Catholic, the Vicomte de l'Estrange, who supported the persecution of Protestants by Cardinal Richelieu. Privas, with a majority of the population Protestant, refused to submit, and as a centre of the revolt of the Benjamin de Rohan, duc de Soubise, was burned to the ground by the forces of Louis XIII, sent to support the Vicomte de l'Estrange. As a result, one-fifth of the Protestant population of the Vivarais emigrated.

The Revocation of the Edict of Nantes in 1685, which finally outlawed Protestantism, resulted in the peasant family of Marie and Pierre Durand leading a revolt against royal authority. This led to the Camisard revolt of the Ardèche prophets. Louis XIV responded by dispatching Dragoons, who brutalised the population by "dragonnades", destroying a number of communities. The brutality of those years was enormous and peace was only restored in 1715. As a result of brutality on both sides, a further 50,000 Archèche Protestants left France, many fleeing to Switzerland, whilst others were forced into abjuration (conversion).

In the following century, despite the growth of the community of Annonay, an increasing polarisation between the upper nobility families such as Rohan Soubise, and Vogue, Count of Aubenas, possessing huge financial fortunes, and the lesser nobility, the village clergy and the bourgeoisie of the Vivarais paralleled developments elsewhere in France. Despite this, the sons of a local Annonay paper-maker, Joseph and Jacques Etienne Montgolfier ascended in the first hot air balloon over the town on 4 June 1783. The firm of Canson Mongolfier continues making paper to this day and on the anniversary every year on the first weekend in June a large hot air balloon gathering celebrates the event of the first journey. At the 200th anniversary in 1983, some 50 hot air balloons took part with the first historic flight reenacted with people dressed in period costume.

Later modern history
At the beginning of the French Revolution, the 1789 Declaration of Human Rights at last recognised Ardèche Protestants as citizens in their own right, free at last to practise their faith. Catholicism nonetheless continued to expand, and by the early 19th century the Ardèche included only 34,000 Protestants out of a population of 290,000. Named after the river of the same name, the Ardèche was one of the original 83 departments created during the French Revolution on 4 March 1790. The support of Count François Antoine de Boissy d'Anglas representing the Third Estate of the Vivarais in the States General, the freeing of the serfs and the support of the lesser clergy of the church ensured that the Ardèchois had supported the early revolution, but they withdrew support when things became more radical. During the Reign of Terror, in 1794, the guillotine at Privas was kept busy with the execution of the former moderate supporters of the revolution. Under the Directory, bands of Chouans took to the Cevennes to escape and support former émigrés.

With the Napoleonic period, the Ardèche entered a period of increasingly prosperous inconspicuousness. After a period of eclipse, Viviers was re-established in 1822 as the site of the see of the bishops of Ardèche, where it remains to this day. Throughout the 19th century, a modest economic growth took place. The population grew from 273,000 in 1793 to 388,500 in 1861. The silk worm industry boomed until 1855, when disease affected the worms and competition with China undermined the industry's profitability. Mining at Privas saw the exploitation of local iron ore, which was quickly depleted. As a result, six blast furnaces were established, but they were only moderately profitable, the last closing at Pouzain in 1929.

The scientific pioneer Marc Seguin, whose inventions played a key role in the development of early locomotives, was born in the department. However, Seguin located his business upstream near Lyon, and industrial development in the Ardèche remained relatively small scale. No large towns appeared in the department during the years of France's industrialisation, and its official population total of 388,500, reached in 1861, turned out to be a peak level which has not been matched subsequently. Since the 1860s, the Ardèche economy has been split between the prosperous Rhône valley and the relatively poor and mountainous Haut Vivarais on the western side of the department. Sheep farming did not lead to the prosperity hoped for and wine growing, which was badly hit by the phylloxera crisis during the closing decades of the 19th century, has had to compete with other more established areas of France.

Geography 

The department, corresponding to the ancient province of Vivarais, is part of the current region of Auvergne-Rhône-Alpes and is surrounded by the French departments of Drôme, Vaucluse, Gard, Lozère, Haute-Loire, Loire and Isère. It is a land of great contrasts: at the lowest it is at a mere 40 metres of elevation above sea level at the point at which the Ardèche river flows into the Rhône (in the southeast of the department) up to 1,754 metres at Mont Mézenc (centre-west), it is bordered to the east by the length of the Rhône valley for 140 km and to the west by the high plateaus of the Massif Central.

At its widest, the department does not exceed 75 km. It covers an area of 5,550 square kilometres, a size that hides the great diversity from place to place in terms of relief, the absence of access to rapid transport (unique in France) and the difficulties in transport from one part of the Ardeche to another, above all in winter. Privas shares this inaccessibility, being by road 589 km from Paris, 574 km from Strasbourg, 215 km from Marseille, 211 km from Annecy, 162 km from Chambéry, 147 km from Nîmes, 140 km from Lyon, 135 km from Grenoble, and 127 km from Saint-Étienne.

Differing natural regions

There are five natural regions of the Ardèche:

The mountains
 
They border the western frontier of the department with an average altitude of 1,100 metres. Basically they are of granitic composition split by the Velay Basalts of the Massif of Mézenc, and the Forez Mounts, centred upon volcanic cones of ash, lava plugs and numerous magma flows (Mézenc: 1,754 metres; Gerbier de Jonc: 1,551 m). Their inclination slopes gently towards the west, thus leading to a westerly flow of water towards the Atlantic. Here the Loire has its source. Within a distance of a few kilometres is the volcanic lake of Issarlès (92 ha, 5 km in circumference, 108 m in depth). The climate is extreme: snow for many months, very violent winds over autumn and winter (known locally as "la burle"), frequent fogs in the valleys, extreme falls of temperature between the seasons, with heavy rains (1,500 mm per year in average) strongly concentrated in September and October.

The plateaus of the Haut-Vivarais and the Cévennes

The transition zone descending from the mountains (1,200 m) to the valley of the Rhône (300 to 400 m), is the plateau region. The medium altitude of the plateau is one of green forested crests separated by wild and uncrossable gorges. Hydrographic resources are dominated by these torrential streams and rainfall is characterised by the frequent importance of summer showers, with climate much less extreme than that of the mountains to the west.
 
The Bas-Vivarais
 
The Ardèche river flows into the Rhône, following a generally south-east course. This Karst region is formed of calcareous limestones, where the streams flow in steep-sided valleys separated by sharp crests. With a generally low altitude the Bas-Vivarais enjoys a warm, and dry, almost Mediterranean climate. Skies are wide and bright, temperatures more elevated (3 or 4 °C in January). The winds from the north-east are dominant, but those of the south (known as the "vent du midi") and of the west are full of humidity, bringing heavy precipitation for a few days at a time. The few rivers, the Lavezon, Escoutay, and Frayol, provide less of a hydrological resource than one sees in the crysaline granitic areas to the north. This is a country of wine, of shrubland, of cereals and extensive fruit trees (this is the region of Aubenas and of Joyeuse).

The plateau of the Coirons

This plateau with an altitude of 800 metres above sea level, is completely surrounded to the north by the valleys of the Ouvèze and the Payre, to the south by the valley of the Escoutay, to the west by the Col of the Escrinet and the valley of Vesseaux. It is built of basalt which extends in length 18 km in the direction of the Rhône, and at its widest is a maximum 11 km in width. The climate here is also fairly extreme: snow, without being thick, is frequent, variations of temperature accentuated by the fact of the strong cold winds that blow. The soil is rich and fertile. Farming is dominated by the growing of wheat, oats and potatoes, dominates, with the raising of goats and cattle. On the slopes one finds vines and fruit trees.
 
The valley of the Rhône
 
The Rhône corridor is very straight on the right bank which runs almost at the foot of the Vivarais plateaus, leaving tiny plains where the rivers from the Vivarais descend to the Rhône. Here the strong wind of the north, (known as the mistral) dominates. Nevertheless, the temperatures are moderated by the influence of the "Midi" to the south. The narrow plains are very fertile and favourable to orchards (peaches and apricots) at first and on the slopes the vines dominate.

Maps of different types of agricultural products translate clearly into these five regions.  "The true character of the Ardèche is" according to A. Siegfried, "of a slope turning towards the Mediterranean, open to the influences coming from the Midi. These influences climb the length of the valleys to the summit of the high plateau, which resists their passage, not letting them penetrate. The high and the low are thus opposed, such is the character of the Ardèche personality."

Principal towns

The most populous commune is Annonay; the prefecture Privas is the sixth-most populous. As of 2019, there are 8 communes with more than 5,000 inhabitants:

Politics

Departmental Council of Ardèche
 
Ardèche is divided into three arrondissements. The President of the Departmental Council has been Olivier Amrane of The Republicans (LR) since 2021.

Representation

National Assembly

The department elected three members of the National Assembly in the 2017 legislative election:

Senate
Representing Ardèche in the Senate are Michel Teston and Yves Chastan.

Demographics 
Population development since 1791:

The inhabitants of the department are called Ardéchois. As one of the poorer districts in France, emigration from the Ardèche outnumbered immigrants for a long time, although this situation has recently changed. In 1990, Ardèche reached once again the population level it had 50 years earlier. Today, the population numbers 309,000 (compared to 390,000 in 1860). Despite this demographic recovery, the area remains marked by a rural exodus which minimises the effects of a higher than average birth rate. Despite this, the rate of natural increase is practically non-existent, as the Ardèche also has a higher than average median age amongst Ardèche born inhabitants, and thus also a higher than average death rate.

Ardèche has a low population of foreign born immigrants, found almost exclusively in the tourist locations of Largentière, Le Pouzin and Bourg-Saint-Andéol. They number about 11,000, representing a full 4% of the population. During the summer months, many European tourists visit the Ardèche, principally Dutch and Germans staying at camping sites.

Some 50% of the population of the department lives in rural communities, compared to a national average of 75% of the French population living in urban locations. The Ardèche has an average population density of 52 per km2, compared to 122 per km2 for the Rhône-Alpes region and 104 per km2 in France. Population density is highest in the regions around the two towns of Annonay and Aubenas and along the edge of the Rhône valley. The mountainous areas is much less densely populated with only 6 to 7 inhabitants per km2 in the cantons of Saint-Étienne-de-Lugdarès and Valgorge. As the mountains and the plateau continue to depopulate, those of the Rhône valley, Bas-Vivarais and lower Ardèche are continuing to grow, but the population situation, whilst better than in the past, still remains an issue for the region.

The Rhône valley and the Annonay region, close to the main axes of communication, (Highways and the TGV railway) are the most urbanised areas of the department. Here the natural growth in population is everywhere positive. Annonay, Tournon-sur-Rhône and Guilherand-Granges benefit from the proximity of the nearby town of Valence and the economically more advanced department of la Drôme. In the southern interior with the town of Aubenas and the valley of the Ardèche river, the population of the cantons of Villeneuve-de-Berg and of Vallon-Pont-d'Arc grow at four times the speed of the departmental average.

The high plateau and the mountainous areas as far as Privas continue to lose its young population (the median age of the population as a whole is growing more elderly as a result of the weakness of the power of this region to attract new permanent inhabitants). For example, le Cheylard and Lamastre have recently lost 300 and 250 inhabitants respectively.

Culture 

With its rivers and streams, Ardèche has become a favorite place for canoe and kayak enthusiasts from around the world. The Ardèche contains a part of Cévennes National Park. The area is very well known for sport climbing, with many well-managed limestone and granite crags.  Each year the Ardeche hosts one of France's biggest road cycling events, L'Ardéchoise, with 16,000 entrants participating in 2011.

The Ardèche department is known for the speciality of Sweet Chestnuts, with the famous "châtaigne d'Ardèche" granted the appellation d'origine contrôlée (AOC) in 2006.

See also
Cantons of the Ardèche department
Communes of the Ardèche department
Arrondissements of the Ardèche department

References

External links

  Prefecture website
  Departmental Council website
  Parc Régional des monts d'Ardèche – Ardèche Regional Park
  All the Ardeche in video HD online, official tourism website with all places to visit, camp-sites, gîtes, hotels and B&Bs.
  The Ardeche County Tourist website, ardeche.com lists a large number of gîtes, camp-sites, hotels and B&Bs.
  Ardèche Découverte Ardeche Discovery Guide
  Ardeche Evasion – Ardèche Web Guide
 Pictures "Panoramio"
  Ardèche Tourist Board

 
Massif Central
1790 establishments in France
Departments of Auvergne-Rhône-Alpes
Climbing areas of France
States and territories established in 1790